Rushes (Juncus species) are used as food plants by the larvae of several Lepidoptera species:

Monophagous
Species which feed exclusively on Juncus

Coleophoridae

 Several Coleophora case-bearer species:
 C. acutiphaga – only on sharp rush (J. acutus)
 C. adjunctella
 C. alticolella
 C. bispinatella – only on Canadian rush (J. canadensis)
 C. caespititiella
 C. concolorella
 C. cratipennella
 C. dentiferoides – only on bayonet rush (J. militaris)
 C. fagicorticella
 C. maritella
 C. maritimella – only on sea rush (J. maritimus)
 C. quadrilineella
 C. sexdentatella – only on Canadian rush (J. canadensis)
 C. taeniipennella

Polyphagous
Species which feed on Juncus and other plants

Batrachedridae
 Batrachedra arenosella (suspected; larval food habits not well known)

Coleophoridae
 Several Coleophora case-bearer species:
 C. glaucicolella
 C. viridicuprella – possibly monophagous on Juncus; recorded on compact rush (J. conglomeratus), common rush (J. effusus), saltmarsh rush (J. gerardii) and hard rush (J. inflexus), and perhaps others

External links

Juncus
Juncus